The zygomaticofrontal suture (or frontozygomatic suture) is the cranial suture between the zygomatic bone and the frontal bone. The suture can be palpated just lateral to the eye.

Additional images

References

External links
 
 

Skull